Olbasa was a town in the Antiochiana district of ancient Lycaonia southwest of Cybistra. 

Its site is unlocated.

References

Populated places in ancient Lycaonia
Former populated places in Turkey
Lost ancient cities and towns